Phugmoche Monastery (or Phugmoche Gonpa), also known as Karma Chos-gLing. This monastery is situated in the Phugmoche village, Dudhkunda Municipality, Solu region of eastern Nepal. It was built in 1938 by Nyang-rigs bLa-ma Ngag-dBang-Yon-tan-rGya-mTsho. It is a Tibetan Buddhist monastery of the Sherpa community.

History
Phugmoche Monastery or Karma Chos-gLing dGon-pa was built by Sherpa Lama Ngagwang Yontan Gyamtsho (bLa-ma Ngag-dBang-Yon-tan-rGya-mTsho) in 1938.

Founder
The founder of Phugmoche Karma Chos-gLing Monastery (Lama Ngagwang Yontan Gyamtsho) was one of the renowned great and accomplished guru in the Sherpa community. He was born in Solukhumbu as son of the Nyang Clan (Nyang-rigs) father Lama Padma Tshewang and mother Drolma in 1875 AD. Since 13 years, he had studied astrology to Dzogpa Chenpo from his father Padma Tshewang and root guru Gangri Tshampa Rinpoche, Drubwang Shakya Shree, Chagchen Rinpoche, Kyabgon Dreltsad Dondan, Ngawang Thrinlas Lhundrub, Ngagwang Norbu Zangpo, Khanpo Sangyas Tanzin, Lama Danu and Lama Kyipa. His spiritual consort was Dechen Palmo also known as Gaga Kyipa. He had given many Tantric Teachings and Initiation to his disciples and passed away in 1964.

External links
 Phugmoche
 Location of Phugmoche on Google Map

References 

Nyingma monasteries and temples
Buddhist monasteries in Nepal
Tourist attractions in Nepal
Buildings and structures in Solukhumbu District
Buddhist temples in Nepal
Buddhism in Nepal
1938 establishments in Nepal